Yushchenko is a Ukrainian surname. Notable people with the surname include:

 Viktor Yushchenko (born 1954), third President of Ukraine
 Kateryna Yushchenko (born 1961), wife of Viktor Yushchenko
 Kateryna Yushchenko (scientist) (1919–2001), Ukrainian computer scientist
 Igor Yushchenko (born 1969), Russian football coach

See also
 

Ukrainian-language surnames